Comes a Horseman is a 1978 American Western drama film starring Jane Fonda, James Caan, Jason Robards, and Richard Farnsworth, directed by Alan J. Pakula.

Set in the American West of the 1940s but not a typical Western, it tells the story of two ranchers (Caan and Fonda) whose small operation is threatened both by economic hardship and the expansionist dreams of a local land baron (Robards).

Plot
It's the 1940s, near the end of World War II in the American West. The setting is a large, fertile valley ideal for grazing cattle. Rancher Jacob W. Ewing's (Jason Robards) family has lived in the valley for generations, and his dream is to control all of it and preserve it from those - farmers and oilmen, for example - who would use the land for other purposes. Visiting J.W. is wealthy oil executive Neil Atkinson, whose late father was J.W.'s good friend and financial backer; the Atkinsons helped J.W. buy out neighboring ranchers, taking advantage of their financial problems (often with some "persuasion" from J.W.'s henchmen). The one remaining holdout is Ella Connors (Jane Fonda), whose family has ranched in the area for the last two generations and who relies on the family's aging but skillful cowhand Dodger (Richard Farnsworth). Another small player is war veteran Frank Athearn (James Caan) to whom Ella has sold a small plot of land to pay her bills. Ella and J.W. have some personal history which Ella prefers to put behind her, but which J.W. keeps bringing up. Although J.W. believes that Ella cannot survive another season financially, Ella and Frank, both of whom are committed to making a living ranching, enter into an uneasy alliance, especially after a dangerous incident precipitated by J.W. involving Frank and Frank's partner, fellow veteran Billy Joe Meynart (Mark Harmon). Neil, meanwhile, wants to explore the entire valley for oil, and uses his family's financial support to pressure J.W. into agreeing. Ella, Frank, and Neil soon discover that J.W. will go to any lengths to get what he wants.

Cast
 James Caan as Frank "Buck" Athearn
 Jane Fonda as Ella Connors
 Jason Robards as Jacob "J.W." Ewing
 George Grizzard as Neil Atkinson
 Richard Farnsworth as Dodger
 Jim Davis as Julie Blocker
 Mark Harmon as Billy Joe Meynert
 Macon McCalman as Virgil Hoverton
 Basil Hoffman as George Bascomb
 James Kline as Ralph Cole
 James Keach as Emil Kroegh

Production
The film was based on an original script Comes a Horseman Wild and Free. In January 1977 it was announced that Jane Fonda and James Caan would play the leads.

"The theme of this film is very, very American," said Pakula.

On 18 August 1977, a stuntman working on this film, Jim Sheppard, was killed while doing a scene where Robards' character is dragged to (presumably) his death. A horse dragging him veered from its course and caused Sheppard to hit his head on a fence post. The scene made it into the movie, but it is cut right before the horse passes through the gate where the fatal accident occurred.

Reception
Gene Siskel of the Chicago Tribune gave the film three-and-a-half stars out of four and called it "a fine film—majestic at times—save for a slapdash ending." A less enthusiastic review in Variety stated the film was "so lethargic not even Jane Fonda, James Caan and Jason Robards can bring excitement to this artificially dramatic story of a stubborn rancher who won't surrender to the local land baron." Charles Champlin of the Los Angeles Times wrote that the film "is not about the plot as such but about the way of life which the plot interrupts. The care and authenticity with which that way of life is recorded helps Comes a Horseman overcome some real problems, notably a pace that is all too reverentially slow and a totally inadequate delineation of the Robards character." Gary Arnold of The Washington Post stated "Pakula and Clark may believe they revere Westerns, but their form of respectful imitation is lifeless, strictly token respect for the dead...By the time Comes a Horseman wheezes to an anticlimactic fadeout, Robards' depredations have begun to resemble Gothic camp."

Farnsworth received a nomination for the Academy Award for Best Supporting Actor  for his performance.

The film grossed $9.6 million at the box office. The film holds a score of 67% on Rotten Tomatoes, based on 12 reviews.

References

External links
 
 
 
 
 
 

1978 films
1978 Western (genre) films
Neo-Western films
American Western (genre) films
1970s English-language films
Films directed by Alan J. Pakula
United Artists films
Films set in the 1940s
Films scored by Michael Small
1978 drama films
1970s American films